Cyanothamnus anemonifolius, commonly known as narrow-leaved boronia or sticky boronia, is a flowering plant that is endemic to south-eastern Australia. It is a shrub with mostly pinnate leaves, with white to pale pink four-petalled flowers in leaf axils.

Description
There are eight stamens with those near the sepals slightly longer than those nearer to the petals.

Taxonomy and naming
This species was first formally described in 1825 by Allan Cunningham and given the name Boronia anemonifolia in the book Geographical Memoirs on New South Wales. In a 2013 paper in the journal Taxon, Marco Duretto and others changed the name to Cyanothamnus anemonifolus on the basis of cladistic analysis. The specific epithet (anemoniifolius) is a reference to the similarity of the leaves of this species to those in the genus Anemone.

In 2000, Peter Neish and Marco Duretto described four subspecies of B. anemonifolia, that were accepted by the Australian Plant Census: The names have subsequently been changed to reflect the change in the genus name:
 Cyanothamnus anemonifolius (A.Cunn.)
 Cyanothamnus anemonifolius subsp. variabilis (Hook.) Duretto & Heslewood has leaves that are simple, pinnate or bipinnate, the petiole about the same length as the leaflets, the leaflets glabrous and the petals not remaining on the fruit;

Distribution and habitat
 Subspecies anemonifolius grows in woodland and heath, often on exposed rocky outcrops on the coast and nearby tablelands from near Rylstone in New South Wales and south to the Brisbane Ranges in Victoria.
 Subspecies aurifodina grows in low, open eucalypt woodland in a few areas in central Victoria.
 Subspecies variabilis is the most widely distributed subspecies and grows in heath, open woodland or open forest in south-east Queensland, on the coast and ranges of New South Wales and in northern and south-eastern Tasmania. In Victoria it only occurs on two islands near Wilsons Promontory.
 Subspecies wadbilligensis grows in eucalypt woodland or low heath on rocky outcrops and is only found on the Wadbilliga plateau in New South Wales.

References

External links

anemonifolius
Flora of New South Wales
Flora of Queensland
Flora of Tasmania
Flora of Victoria (Australia)
Sapindales of Australia
Taxa named by Allan Cunningham (botanist)